

The Catholic Church of Our Lady of the Rosary is a Catholic church in Doha, Qatar. It is located, along with churches of other Christian denominations, at the Religious Complex in Abu Hamour. It is the first church built in the country since the Muslim conquests in the 7th century.

The church was constructed at a cost of around $20 million on land donated by the Emir of Qatar, Hamad bin Khalifa Al Thani. Due to the laws in Islamic Qatar, the church displays no Christian symbols like crosses, bells, or a steeple on its exterior.

The church was dedicated on 14 March 2008, by Cardinal Ivan Dias, prefect of the Congregation for the Evangelisation, in a ceremony attended by Qatari Deputy Prime Minister Abdullah Bin Hamad Al-Attiyah; Archbishop Mounged Al Hachem, the ambassador of the Holy See to the Gulf; Bishop Paul Hinder, Apostolic Vicariate of Arabia; Archbishop Giuseppe Andrea, former nuncio of the Holy See to the region; and several Qatari officials.

The church is part of the Apostolic Vicariate of Northern Arabia and serves around 200,000 Catholics in Qatar, most of them migrant workers from the Philippines, India, South America, Africa, Lebanon and Europe.

See also
 Catholic Church in Qatar
 Freedom of religion in Qatar

References

Further reading

External links
 Official website 
 Official Arabic website  
 Catholic Blog, Our Lady of the Rosary Parish Doha, Qatar

2008 establishments in Qatar
Roman Catholic churches completed in 2008
Churches in Qatar
Catholic Church in Qatar
Roman Catholic churches in Qatar
Apostolic Vicariate of Northern Arabia
Catholic Church in the Arabian Peninsula